Beeston Hockey Club is a field hockey club based in Beeston, England. The club was founded in 1907, and plays its home games at the Nottingham Hockey Centre in Nottingham. Beeston is nicknamed the Bees.

The men's 1st XI plays in the Men's England Hockey League and the ladies 1st XI in the Women's England Hockey League. The majority of the other teams compete in the Midlands League. The large club fields six men's sides, seven ladies sides and various junior sides.

History
The men's 1st XI won its first major trophy in 2008, defeating Bowdon 4–3 in the Men's National Cup. The men's team won its first National League Premier Division title in 2010/11, and went on to win it again in 2012/13 and 2013/14. The men's 1st XI have also competed in the Euro Hockey League. Beeston HC twinned with HC Rotterdam on 1 February 2017.

In 2020, Beeston secured an historic cup double by winning both the men's cup and women's cup competitions in the same season. On 5 September the women's team won their COVID-19 delayed final beating the defending champions Clifton Robinsons 3-2 in the final. At the same time the men won their delayed semi final on penalties and one week later on 12 September defeated Fareham 9-1 in the final. The women's first team won the 2022 England Hockey Women's Championship Cup.

Players

Men's First Team Squad 2020–21 season

 (captain)''

Ladies First Team Squad 2021–22 season

Men's Team Honours
 2010–11 Men's League Champions
 2012–13 Men's League Champions
 2013–14 Men's League Champions
 2007–08 Men's Cup Winners
 2009–10 Men's Cup Winners
 2010–11 Men's Cup Winners
 2011–12 Men's Cup Winners
 2015–16 Men's Cup Winners
 2019–20 Men's Cup Winners

Women's Team Honours
 2019–20 Women's Cup Winners
 2021–22 Women's Cup Winners

Notable players

Men's internationals

 David Ames
 Mark Gleghorne

 Jamie Cachia
 James McBlane
 Gordon McIntyre

 Ollie Cooper
 David Griffiths
 Zak Jones
 Ben Rogers
 Matt Simkin

 Craig Boyne

 Patrick Schmidt

 Muhammad Nadeem

Women's internationals

 Nicki Cochrane

References

External links
Beeston Hockey Club official web site

 
English field hockey clubs
Sport in Nottinghamshire
1907 establishments in England
Field hockey clubs established in 1907
Beeston, Nottinghamshire
Sport in Nottingham